Valley Township is a township in Kingman County, Kansas, USA.  As of the 2000 census, its population was 102.

Geography
Valley Township covers an area of 36.29 square miles (93.98 square kilometers); of this, 0.05 square miles (0.14 square kilometers) or 0.15 percent is water. The streams of Copper Creek, Red Creek and Rose Bud Creek run through this township.

Unincorporated towns
 Rago
(This list is based on USGS data and may include former settlements.)

Adjacent townships
 Richland Township (north)
 Eagle Township (northeast)
 Canton Township (east)
 Township No. 6, Harper County (southeast)
 Township No. 1, Harper County (southwest)
 Chikaskia Township (west)
 Belmont Township (northwest)

Cemeteries
The township contains one cemetery, Rago.

Major highways
 K-14 (Kansas highway)
 K-42 (Kansas highway)

References
 U.S. Board on Geographic Names (GNIS)
 United States Census Bureau cartographic boundary files

External links
 US-Counties.com
 City-Data.com

Townships in Kingman County, Kansas
Townships in Kansas